Apple Creek may refer to these places in the United States:

Communities
Apple Creek, Missouri
Apple Creek, Ohio
Apple Creek, Wisconsin

Watercourse
Apple Creek (Mississippi River), Missouri